The ninth season of the American horror anthology television series American Horror Story, subtitled 1984, takes place outside Los Angeles during the 1980s and focuses the staff of a summer camp reopening after a massacre 14 years prior. It has been described as being heavily influenced by classic slasher films, such as Friday the 13th (1980) and Halloween (1978). The ensemble cast includes Emma Roberts, Billie Lourd, Leslie Grossman, Cody Fern, Matthew Morrison, Gus Kenworthy, John Carroll Lynch, Angelica Ross, and Zach Villa, with all returning from previous seasons, except newcomers Morrison, Kenworthy, Ross, and Villa. The season marks the first to not feature cast mainstays Sarah Paulson and Evan Peters.

Created by Ryan Murphy and Brad Falchuk for cable network FX, the series is produced by 20th Century Fox Television. 1984 was broadcast between September 18 to November 13, 2019, consisting of nine episodes. The season was praised by critics for its performances, writing, and homages to the 1980s slasher releases.

Cast and characters

Main

 Emma Roberts as Brooke Thompson
 Billie Lourd as Montana Duke
 Leslie Grossman as Margaret Booth
 Cody Fern as Xavier Plympton
 Matthew Morrison as Trevor Kirchner
 Gus Kenworthy as Chet Clancy
 John Carroll Lynch as Benjamin Richter / Mr. Jingles
 Angelica Ross as Donna Chambers / Rita R.N.
 Zach Villa as Richard Ramirez

Recurring
 DeRon Horton as Ray Powell
 Orla Brady as Dr. Karen Hopple
 Lou Taylor Pucci as Jonas Shevoore
 Tara Karsian as Chef Bertie
 Emma Meisel as Midge
 Kat Solko as Helen
 Conor Donnally as Eddie
 Sean Liang as Wide Load
 Leslie Jordan as Courtney
 Lily Rabe as Lavinia Richter
 Dylan McDermott as Bruce
 Filip Alexander as Bobby Richter

Guest stars
 Mitch Pileggi as Art
 Don Swayze as Roy
 Todd Stashwick as Blake 
 Steven Culp as Mr. Thompson 
 Spencer Neville as Joey Cavanaugh 
 Zach Tinker as Sam Duke 
 Mateo Gallegos as Young Richard Ramirez 
 Dreama Walker as Rita R.N. 
 Mark Daugherty as Chan 
 Tim Russ as David Chambers 
 Richard Gunn as Chief Deputy 
 Nick Chinlund as Prison Warden 
 Tanya Clarke as Lorraine Richter 
 Yvonne Zima as Red 
 Eric Staves as Dustin 
 Connor Cain as Young Benjamin Richter 
 Stefanie Black as Stacey Phillips 
 Finn Wittrock as Bobby Richter

Episodes

Production

Development
On January 12, 2017, American Horror Story was renewed for a ninth season, with a two-season renewal alongside Apocalypse, set to air in 2019. On April 10, 2019, series co-creator Ryan Murphy announced that the title of the season would be 1984. The season has been described as being heavily influenced by classic horror slasher films such as Friday the 13th, A Nightmare on Elm Street, and Halloween.

On June 24, 2019, FX announced that the season would premiere on September 18, 2019. The official trailer for the season was released on August 26, 2019. On September 12, 2019, Murphy revealed the opening credits for 1984 via his Instagram account. He explained that it was inspired by Corey Vega's fan-made concept, which strongly impressed him. As a result, he invited Vega to work with series veteran collaborator Kyle Cooper on the official sequence. Later that month, FX officially released the promo posters for the season, confirming the main cast's character names.

On October 17, 2019, it was announced that 1984 would conclude with its ninth episode, one less than the 10 episodes that were originally ordered. This makes it the shortest season in the entire series, and the third season after Murder House and Hotel to reduce its original episode count.

Casting
On February 6, 2019, Murphy revealed that Emma Roberts and series newcomer Gus Kenworthy would star in the season. In July 2019, Angelica Ross announced that she would have a series regular role in the season. Later that month, Billie Lourd, Cody Fern, Leslie Grossman, and John Carroll Lynch were confirmed to be returning to the series, with new cast members Matthew Morrison, DeRon Horton, and Zach Villa. In October 2019, filming pictures confirmed that original cast member Dylan McDermott would appear in the season. Later that month, series veteran Lily Rabe confirmed via her Instagram account that she would appear in the seventh episode of the season. In November 2019, it was confirmed that Finn Wittrock would return for the season finale. 

On April 2, 2019, series mainstay Evan Peters, who had starred in all eight previous seasons, announced he would not appear in this season. On May 23, 2019, Billy Eichner, who appeared in Cult and Apocalypse, stated that he would not be returning in the season. On July 8, 2019, it was reported by Deadline Hollywood that Sarah Paulson would have a smaller role in 1984 than in previous seasons, due to her commitments to Murphy's Netflix series Ratched. However, in October 2019, Paulson herself confirmed that she would not appear in 1984 as originally planned.

Filming
On July 11, 2019, Murphy confirmed the season had begun filming.

Reception

Critical response

American Horror Story: 1984 received critical acclaim. On the review aggregator website Rotten Tomatoes, the season holds an 88% approval rating, with an average rating of 7.45/10, based on 169 reviews. The site's critical consensus reads: "A near-perfect blend of slasher tropes and American Horror Storys trademark twists, 1984 is a bloody good time."

However, the portrayal of Richard Ramirez received criticism, with many, including the families of Ramirez’s victims, accusing the show of glamorising him.

Awards and nominations

Ratings

Notes

References

External links
 
 

2010s American drama television series
2019 American television seasons
09
Cultural depictions of Richard Ramirez
Ghosts in television
Mass murder in fiction
Satanism in popular culture
Serial killers in television
Summer camps in television
Television series set in 1970
Television series set in 1984
Television series set in 1985
Television series set in 1989
Matricide in fiction